Roy Wallis (1945–1990) was a sociologist and Dean of the Faculty of Economics and Social Sciences at the Queen's University Belfast. He is mostly known for his creation of the seven signs that differentiate a religious congregation from a sectarian church, which he created while researching the Church of Scientology. He introduced the distinction between world-affirming and world-rejecting new religious movements.

After publishing his book The Road to Total Freedom (1976), an in-depth analysis of the sociology of Scientology, he was harassed by the church both legally and personally. Forged letters, apparently from Wallis, were sent to his colleagues implicating him in various scandalous activities.

Publications
 Roy Wallis (1975) Sectarianism: Analyses of Religious and Non-Religious Sects, London: Peter Owen & New York: John Wiley, 
 Roy Wallis (1976) The Road to Total Freedom: A Sociological Analysis of Scientology, London: Heinemann. . US edition published 1977 by Columbia University Press, 
 Roy Wallis and Peter Morley (1976) Marginal Medicine, New York: Free Press, 
 Roy Wallis and Peter Morley (1978) Culture and Curing: Anthropological Perspectives on Traditional Medical Beliefs and Practices, Pittsburgh: University of Pittsburgh Press, & London: Peter Owen, 
 Roy Wallis (1979) On the Margins of Science: the Social Construction of Rejected Knowledge, Keele: University of Keele Press, 
 Roy Wallis (1979) Salvation and Protest: Studies of Social and Religious Movements, New York: St. Martin's Press, 
 Roy Wallis (1984) The Elementary Forms of the New Religious Life, London and Boston: Routledge and Kegan Paul,

References

External links
 Roy Wallis (1976), The Road to Total Freedom, A Sociological analysis of Scientology, 
 Roy Wallis (1984), The Elementary Forms of the New Religious Life, London: Routledge and Kegan Paul, 

Sociologists of religion
1945 births
1990 deaths
Alumni of the University of Oxford
Academics of Queen's University Belfast
Scientology-related controversies
Critics of Scientology